Tall Tales from the Magical Garden of Antoon Krings, also released as simply Tall Tales, is a 2017 French-language 3D computer-animated adventure film written and directed by  and  and written by Christel Gonnard, based on the Funny Little Animals series of children's books by Kring. An international co-production between France and Luxembourg, Tall Tales from the Magical Garden of Antoon Krings was produced by Onyx Films and Bidibul Productions. It was released in France on 13 December 2017.

Premise 
Apollo the Cricket, a traveling performer, arrives at the village of the Little Bugs and falls into a trap set by Queen Marguerite's cousin, Huguette, who plans on seizing the throne. Caught in the commotion, Apollo ends up being erroneously accused of kidnapping the Queen. In order to prove his innocence, he sets out on a journey to save Queen Marguerite.

Voice cast 
Emmanuel Curtil as Apollo the cricket
Kev Adams as Loulou the louse
Virginie Efira as Huguette the wasp
Anne Tilloy as Queen Marguerite
Céline Melloul as Mireille the bee
Jean-Philippe Janssens as Simeon the butterfly
Vincent Ropion as Louie
Jérémie Covillault as Sphinx
Marie-Charlotte Leclaire as Patouch the fly
Didier Gustin as Incognito
Arnaud Léonard as General Krypton
Alexandre Nguyen as Léon le bourdon
Pierre-Alain de Garrigues as Père Pétard

Production 
According to director Antoon Krings, the film took five years to make, from scriptwriting to its release. The soundtrack was composed by Bruno Coulais.

Release 
It had an opening gross of $352,418, for a total gross of $1,738,356. The highest-grossing country was China; released on 13 April 2019 by Huaxia Film Distribution, Tall Tales from the Magical Garden of Antoon Krings opened with $985,873 for a total gross of $11,422,395. Elsewhere, it grossed $1,179,975, contributing to its worldwide box office gross of $14,340,726.

References

External links 

Tall Tales from the Magical Garden of Antoon Krings at Cineuropa

2017 films
2017 animated films
2010s French-language films
2010s children's animated films
French-language Luxembourgian films
Luxembourgian animated films
French animated films
French children's films
French adventure films
Films scored by Bruno Coulais
2010s French films